Takab Rural District is a rural district (dehestan) in Kuhsorkh County, Razavi Khorasan province, Iran. At the 2006 census, its population was 5,772, in 1,482 families.  The rural district has 8 villages.

References 

Rural Districts of Razavi Khorasan Province
Kuhsorkh County